Sarcodon procerus is a species of tooth fungus in the family Bankeraceae. Found in the Democratic Republic of the Congo, it was described as new to science in  1967 by Dutch mycologist Rudolph Arnold Maas Geesteranus. Its spores measure 6.7–8 by 4.5–5.4 µm.

References

External links

Fungi described in 1967
Fungi of Africa
procerus